Matthew Deneen (born September 19, 1968) is an American politician from Kentucky. He is a member of the Republican Party and has represented District 10 in the Kentucky Senate since January 1, 2023. Deneen resides in Elizabethtown, Kentucky.

References 

1968 births
21st-century American politicians
Living people
Republican Party Kentucky state senators

External links
 Matthew D. Deneen at Official Republican Party website